In the Forests of Siberia (original title: Dans les forêts de Sibérie) is a 2016 French film directed by Safy Nebbou and adapted by Nebbou and David Oelhoffen from Sylvain Tesson's 2011 book The Consolations of the Forest. It stars Raphaël Personnaz.

Plot 
To satisfy a need for freedom, the French media-director Teddy decides to leave the noise of the world, and settles alone in a cabin on the frozen shores of Lake Baikal.
One night, lost in the blizzard, he is rescued by Aleksei, a Russian murderer on the run, who has been hiding in the Siberian forest for several years.
Between these two men, who are opposed to each other, friendship will be born as sudden as essential.

Cast 
 Raphaël Personnaz as Teddy
 Yevgeny Sidikhin as Aleksei

See also

References

External links 
 

2016 films
2010s buddy drama films
Drama films based on actual events
2010s French-language films
2010s Russian-language films
French buddy drama films
Films about friendship
Films based on non-fiction books
Films set in forests
Films set in Siberia
Films directed by Safy Nebbou
2010s survival films
French survival films
2016 drama films
2016 multilingual films
French multilingual films
2010s French films